Ethan Erhahon (born 9 May 2001) is a Scottish professional footballer who plays for EFL League One club Lincoln City, as a midfielder.

Club career
Born in Glasgow, Erhahon joined St Mirren at the age of 5. He was a participant in the SFA's Performance School programme at Holyrood Secondary School. In November 2018 he was praised by manager Oran Kearney. In January 2019, he scored his first senior goal in a 3–2 Scottish Cup win at home to Alloa Athletic.

Erhahon moved to Barnsley on loan in January 2020.

St Mirren accepted an offer from Forest Green Rovers for Erhahon in December 2022. On 31 January 2023, Erhahon joined Lincoln City for an undisclosed fee on a long-contract. He made his debut the following weekend, playing 90 minutes in the 3-0 win against Accrington Stanley on 4 February 2023.

International career
Born in Scotland, Erhahon is of Nigerian descent. He has represented Scotland at several youth international levels, and made his debut for the under-21 team in June 2021.

Career statistics

References

2001 births
Living people
Footballers from Glasgow
Scottish footballers
Scotland youth international footballers
Scotland under-21 international footballers
Scottish Professional Football League players
Association football midfielders
Black British sportsmen
British sportspeople of Nigerian descent
Scottish people of Nigerian descent
St Mirren F.C. players
Barnsley F.C. players
Lincoln City F.C. players
People educated at Holyrood Secondary School
Sportspeople of Nigerian descent
English Football League players